Oluvil Lighthouse is a lighthouse situated on the southern east coast of Sri Lanka at Oluvil, which is located approximately  south of Kalmunai.

The lighthouse is operated and maintained by the Sri Lanka Ports Authority. It is the first lighthouse erected after the Sri Lankan independence, until the Hambantota Port and the Colombo Port expansion occurred in 2012–13.

The lighthouse was declared open on 19 June 1999 by then Sri Lanka's Minister for Port Development, Rehabilitation and Reconstruction and the Sri Lanka Muslim Congress leader M. H. M. Ashraff.

2004 tsunami
In 2004, following the Indian Ocean tsunami, the harbor, town and the lighthouse tower were damaged but the damage has been repaired.

See also

 List of lighthouses in Sri Lanka

References

External links
 Sri Lanka Ports Authority 
 Lighthouses of Sri Lanka

Lighthouses in Sri Lanka
Lighthouses completed in 1999
Buildings and structures in Ampara District
1999 establishments in Sri Lanka